Phurbu Tsering Rinpoche  is a Tibetan abbot. Arrested by Chinese authority, he is the first senior Buddhist leader to face serious charges linked to the demonstrations in 2008.

References

Tibetan Buddhists from Tibet
Tibet freedom activists
Buddhist monks from Tibet
21st-century Buddhist monks
Tibetan Buddhist monks